Seanor is an unincorporated community and coal town in Somerset County, Pennsylvania, United States. Its post office closed in 2004.

References

Unincorporated communities in Somerset County, Pennsylvania
Coal towns in Pennsylvania
Unincorporated communities in Pennsylvania